Unión Deportiva Barbadás is a football team based in Barbadás in the autonomous community of Galicia. Founded in 1998, they play in Preferente de Galicia – Group 2, holding home matches at the Estadio Os Carrís.

Accomplishments
2011–12 Preferente Autónomica group south champion
2011–12 Preferente Autónomica overall runners-up

Season to season

5 seasons in Tercera División

References

External links
official website
Futbolme team profile 

Football clubs in Galicia (Spain)
Association football clubs established in 1998
1998 establishments in Spain